The National Treasury of Norway consisted of 50 tonnes of gold worth  in 1940 (approximately  in 1940, or  in 2015.)

When the German invasion began, the gold was evacuated from Oslo first overland to Åndalsnes and then by ship to Tromsø. From Tromsø, evacuating Allied forces took the cargo of gold to Britain. The gold arrived safely in Britain despite German ground and air attacks. It was ultimately shipped to North America.

Evacuation from Oslo 
The gold was stored in the main vault of the Norges Bank's headquarters in Oslo. During the increasing tension of the 1930s, plans were made to make the gold more mobile. When the Second World War broke out, these plans were accelerated and the gold was packed into 818 crates of 40 kg, 685 crates of 25 kg and 39 barrels of gold coins, weighing 80 kg each: a total of 53 tons.

When news reached the government in the early hours of the 9th of April, 1940 that the patrol boat Pol III had been attacked and that enemy ships were approaching Oslo, orders went out to evacuate the gold to the vault in Lillehammer. Forklifts from local businesses were used to load the gold onto 26 civilian lorries. The last lorries left Oslo hours before the Wehrmacht arrived.

By train and lorry to Åndalsnes 
The gold stayed at Lillehammer for a few days before having to move again due to the German advance. It was loaded onto a train and travelled across country away from the German advance.  Meanwhile, the Norwegian government and King Haakon VII were separately evading the German advance. German paratroopers attempted to reach Lillehammer in buses to capture the dignitaries and gold, but were stopped by an improvised defence at Midtskogen. Norwegian troops from Jørstadmoen, including poet Nordahl Grieg, were deployed to Lillehammer to guard the train.

The train left Lillehammer on April 19th, and arrived in Åndalsnes on April 20th, where British expeditionary troops had landed a few days before. Åndalsnes was bombed several times by the Germans. The train was undamaged in the bombings and was moved to Romsdalshorn station, outside Åndalsnes. The British were informed of the gold, and agreed to evacuate it to Britain and then perhaps onwards to America. The gold was to be split between three ships. The first, the British cruiser HMS Galatea departed from Åndalsnes on Thursday, April 25th, with 200 crates.

By ship to Tromsø 
No further loading was done at Åndalsnes due to the approach of German troops through the Gudbrandsdalen, as well as further air raids. The gold was moved on 23-28 lorries to Molde, to be embarked on the British cruiser HMS Glasgow with the King and the government, and taken to Tromsø and then to Britain. The city was being bombed when they arrived. 756 crates and all 39 barrels were loaded onto Glasgow before, late on Monday, April 29th, Captain Pegram judged that they could wait no longer and ordered the ship north to Tromsø. 18 tonnes of gold, in 301 large and 246 smaller crates, were left behind. The coastal steamer Driva took on most of the remainder before bombing suspended loading. The 30 crates left by Driva were moved by lorries to Gjemnes, to be picked up by the steamer on its way north to Tromsø.

Driva was attacked by German aircraft several times and beached to avoid sinking. The gold was transferred to five fishing vessels from Bud and Hustad. These were Heimdal, Barden, Svanen, Leif and Gudrun, captained by Hans M. Inderhaug, Harald Tungehaug, Engvald Sunde, Emil Skottheim and Alfred Skottheim respectively. As hoped, the fishing vessels did not draw attention and they arrived at Gjemnes without incident, and the 30 crates brought north by road were picked up. The five boats continued north to Titran, arriving at the island of Frøya in Trøndelag on Saturday, May 3rd. The soldiers from Jørstadmoen were sent home, and the gold was transferred to two larger fishing vessels. The two ships left on May 4th, and arrived in Tromsø on May 8th.

Evacuation overseas 
In Tromsø, the gold was loaded onto the British cruiser HMS Enterprise. The cruiser sailed south to Harstad, before departing on May 25th. Enterprise survived two German air attacks en route to Scapa Flow. From there, she sailed to Greenock, where the gold was brought ashore. The gold was taken by train to the Bank of England's vault in London. Finally, the gold was shipped in installments across the Atlantic Ocean to America and to Canada. Of the 50 tonnes from Oslo, the only losses were 297 gold coins from a barrel damaged during transit aboard a British vessel.

The gold was gradually sold in the United States – partly to fund the government in exile. Ten tonnes of gold coins returned to Norway in 1987.

In popular culture
Snow Treasure — an American children's novel giving a fictionalised account of the gold's transport.
Pimpernel Gold: How Norway foiled the Nazis — a partially fictionalized account of the story, by Dorothy Baden-Powell.
Gold Run — a 2022 Norwegian film about the gold's transport.

See also
 Gold reserves of Norway
 Operation Fish
 Moscow Gold
 Romanian Treasure, the Romanian gold reserves sent (alongside other valuable objects) to Russia for safekeeping during World War I, but never returned.

References

Further reading
 Pearson, Robert (2015). Gold Run: The Rescue of Norway's Gold Bullion from the Nazis, 1940. Casemate Books.

External links
 Chronological list of events 
 Eye-witness reports from a bombing raid on Driva 

1940 in Norway
Norwegian campaign
Public finance of Norway
Gold
Economic history of World War II